The Arsenicker Keys or Arsnicker Keys may refer to any one of three groups of islands in southern Florida, in the United States. "Arsenicker", or "Arsnicker", is a corruption of "Marsh sneaker", a name used by Bahamians for the Great Blue Heron.

In Biscayne Bay 
The Arsenicker Keys are a group of islands at the southern end of Biscayne Bay in Miami-Dade County. They are located within Biscayne National Park. The group includes:
 Arsenicker Key. The island was formerly called North Arsnicker Key.
 East Arsenicker Key.
 Long Arsenicker Key.
 West Arsenicker Key.

Ibis, herons, and cormorants nest on the Arsenicker keys, and frigatebirds roost there seasonally. Arsenicker Key and West Arsenicker Key, and the waters out to 300 feet surrounding those islands, are closed to all entry by the public to protect the nesting sites.

In Florida Bay 
The Upper Arsnicker Keys are a group of islands in Florida Bay, in Monroe County, seven miles north of Long Key in the Florida Keys. The island group was known as the Cooper Islands in the 18th century. The group includes Center Key.

The Lower Arsnicker Keys are another group of islands in Florida Bay.

References

External links 

Islands of Miami-Dade County, Florida
Islands of Monroe County, Florida
Uninhabited islands of Miami-Dade County, Florida
Uninhabited islands of Monroe County, Florida